Communist Party of Colombia (Marxist–Leninist) (PC de C (M-L)), is a Colombian anti-revisionist Marxist–Leninist communist party that splintered from the main Colombian Communist Party around 1965.

It was originally of Maoist orientation, but later it evolved a pro-Albanian stance. PC de C (M-L) is an underground party and a Hoxhaist follower.

The armed wing of PC de C (M-L) is the Popular Liberation Army (EPL) guerrilla group.

The PC de C (M-L) and EPL suffered a major setback in 1990, when the majority of its cadres surrendered to the government. The members of this defeated faction regrouped themselves as the political organization Hope, Peace, and Liberty (ESPALI). Internationally, it is affiliated with the International Conference of Marxist–Leninist Parties and Organizations (Unity & Struggle).

External links

Communist parties in Colombia
Stalinist parties
Anti-revisionist organizations
Hoxhaist parties
Far-left politics in Colombia
Communist militant groups
International Conference of Marxist–Leninist Parties and Organizations (Unity & Struggle)
Political parties established in 1965